Rubén Abreu Rivero (born 22 February 1972) is a Venezuelan cyclist. He competed in the 1996 Summer Olympics.

References

1972 births
Living people
Cyclists at the 1996 Summer Olympics
Venezuelan male cyclists
Olympic cyclists of Venezuela
20th-century Venezuelan people